Biosemiotics is a triannual peer-reviewed scientific journal on biosemiotics published by Springer Science+Business Media. It was established in 2008 with 3 issues per year and is an official journal of the International Society for Biosemiotic Studies. The current editor-in-chief is Yogi Hale Hendlin (Erasmus University Rotterdam).

Abstracting and indexing
The journal is abstracted and indexed in:

According to the Journal Citation Reports, the journal has a 2020 impact factor of 0.711.

References

External links
 

Semiotics journals
Biology journals
Springer Science+Business Media academic journals
Publications established in 2008
Triannual journals